The 2001–02 Egyptian Premier League was the 45th season of the Egyptian Premier League, the top Egyptian professional league for association football clubs, since its establishment in 1948. The season began on 21 September 2001 and concluded on 04 July 2002.

Ismaily won their 3rd Egyptian Premier League title in the club history.

Ghazl El Suez, Sohag and El Qanah have entered as the three promoted teams from the Egyptian Second Division.

Teams

 Al Ahly
 Tersana
 Zamalek
 Ghazl Al-Mehalla
 Goldi
 Ismaily
 El-Ittihad El-Iskandary
 El-Masry
 El Mansoura
 Baladeyet El-Mahalla
 Al Mokawloon Al Arab
 El Qanah
 Ghazl El Suez
 Sohag

League table

References

External links
All Egyptian Competitions Info
season info

0
2001–02 in African association football leagues
Premier